The United States women's national soccer team (sometimes referred to as USWNT) represents the United States in international soccer competition and is controlled by U.S. Soccer. The U.S. team won the first ever Women's World Cup in 1991, and has since been a superpower in women's soccer.

In 2007, the team won the Four Nations Tournament (women's football) (5th title through 2007), the Algarve Cup (5th title through 2007) and placed 3rd at the 2007 FIFA Women's World Cup, finishing with a 19–1–4 record.

After defeating England in the World Cup Quarterfinals, Head Coach Greg Ryan decided to bench regular goalkeeper Hope Solo in favor of veteran goalkeeper Briana Scurry. The team subsequently lost to Brazil 0–4 (the worst defeat in the team's history) and Ryan received considerable criticism for the sudden lineup change as well as defensive-minded substitutions made when the team arguably needed more offensive players to compete against the Brazilians.  On Monday October 22, 2007 U.S. Soccer President Sunil Gulati announced that Ryan's contract would not be extended past its December 31, 2007 expiration date.

2007 Schedule 
The following is a list of matches that were played in 2007.

2007 Four Nations Tournament

2007 Algarve Cup

International Friendlies

2007 FIFA Women's World Cup

International Friendlies

References 
 U.S. Soccer

 
2007
national